LeapPad is a range of tablet computers developed for children. Various models of the LeapPad have been developed since 1999.

Development history
The device, resembling a talking book, took 3 years to develop and was introduced to the market in 1999. In 2001 (sales $160 million) and 2002 it was the best-selling toy in specialty stores. Sales in 2003 reached $680 million and were only eclipsed by sales of the book and cartridge add-ons. LeapStart is in red, Leap 1 is in orange, Leap 2 is in blue, and Leap 3 is in green.

LeapPad was invented by Jim Marggraff and developed by a team from Explore Technologies, Inc., which was founded by Marggraff and acquired by LeapFrog in July 1998. It uses the same patented "NearTouch" technology developed for the Explore Technologies Odyssey Atlasphere. Investigation and development was started in December 1997.

Models

Various models of the LeapPad were developed between its launch in 1999 and 2020:
 LeapPad (original model)
 LeapPad Plus Writing
 Read and Write LeapPad
 LeapPad Plus Microphone (also known as Read Aloud LeapPad)
 LeapPad Pro
 Quantum LeapPad (also known as Quantum Pad)
 LeapPad Plus Writing and Microphone
 Learn & Go LeapPad
 Cocopad (released only in Japan)
 LeapPad Explorer - The device is similar to Apple's iPad, but unlike the iPad, users can only download proprietary LeapFrog apps. The device has the capability to capture movies and take pictures. It was released in the summer of 2011. LeapFrog won the Platinum Award for LeapPad™ from the Oppenheim Toy Portfolio in September 2011.
 LeapPad2 (released in the summer of 2012)
 LeapPad Ultra (released in the summer of 2013)
 LeapPad3 (released in the summer of 2014)
 LeapPad Platinum (released in the summer of 2015)
 LeapPad Ultimate (released in February 2017)
 LeapPad Academy (released in the summer of 2020)

Spin-offs incompatible with the mainstream series

The LeapPad's popularity helped spawn other LeapPad branded devices that are incompatible with the mainstream LeapPad series of players. These devices were meant for younger audiences who are not ready for the mainstream LeapPad's titles. 
 My First LeapPad - Targeted for preschoolers to Kindergarten-going children, the design of the LeapPad is different from a regular LeapPad in that the books are flipped upwards. The unit was later redesigned to be shaped like a school bus. A British-voiced version was also available in the UK.
 LittleTouch LeapPad - Targeted for babies to toddlers, the unit operated significantly different from a regular LeapPad in that it did not require a stylus to operate. The unit also featured a soft pad underneath to allow for the device to sit comfortably on the parents' or toddler's lap.

Technology
The LeapPad is a computer with electrographic sensor. The sensor works as a capacitor and measures the amount of current flowing through corner electrodes into a plate beneath the table top, and uses that information to triangulate the location of the stylus on the table top. The LeapPad is covered by U.S. patents 5686705 and 5877458.

Competition and comparisons
The popularity of the LeapPad spawned a few competitions, most notably with Mattel under their Fisher-Price brand who launched the PowerTouch Learning System in 2003, and later in the following year with the PowerTouch Baby. The PowerTouch Learning System was far more advanced than the LeapPad in many ways, requiring no stylus to operate as it uses a touch-sensitive area, and even the ability to detect page changes automatically via a set of infrared sensors on the top of the device (which also imposed a limitation on how many pages a book for the system can offer). Despite the improvements and backing from popular brands like Nelvana and Scholastic, the PowerTouch did not catch on with the public as widely as the LeapPad did although it does have its share of followers. 

The LeapPad also faced competition from publisher Publications International, Ltd. whose specialty included electronic children books with sound modules. The ActivePoint and Magic Wand titles operated on a similar principle to the LeapPad. However, the system faced limitations in that the book itself is bound to the reader and stylus and thus cannot be interchanged. Publications International later introduced the Story Reader and My First Story Reader system, which is more limited in function in that it will only read the story as the user turns the page, and features less interactive features: The Story Reader completely lacks any interactive functions, while the My First Story Reader only has simple quizzes answered through the use of three buttons at the bottom of the device. Due to the lower cost of the system, Publications International's offering remained competitive with the LeapPad. The tablet range of the LeapPad also competed with VTech's InnoTab line of interactive tablet computers.

Awards
LeapPad won the first-ever People's Choice Toy of the Year (T.O.T.Y.) award, as well as the Educational T.O.T.Y. award in 2000, sponsored by the Toy Industry Association. LeapPad2 would win both awards in 2013.

In September 2011, LeapFrog won the Platinum Award for LeapPad(TM) from the Oppenheim Toy Portfolio.

References

Educational toys
Computer-related introductions in 1999
Electronic toys